Quintin Cogly was an Irish clergyman and bishop for the Roman Catholic Diocese of Dromore. He raised in Gaelic Irish family root. He settled in the Barony of Carra. He was a student at Paris in 1520s and entered the Dominican order. He became ordained in 1536. He was appointed bishop in 1536. He died in 1539.

References

16th-century Roman Catholic bishops in Ireland
1500 births
1539 deaths
Year of birth uncertain
Roman Catholic bishops of Dromore
Irish Dominicans